Trophon bahamondei is a species of sea snail, a marine gastropod mollusk in the family Muricidae, the murex snails or rock snails.

Description
The shell can grow to be 35mm to 50mm in length.

Distribution
It can be found in Chile, mostly off of Quintero.

References

Gastropods described in 1982
Endemic fauna of Chile
Trophon